Nostima is a genus of shore flies in the family Ephydridae.

Species
N. approximata Sturtevant and Wheeler, 1954
N. duoseta Cresson, 1943
N. gilvipes (Coquillett, 1900)
N. negramaculata Edmiston & Mathis, 2007
N. niveivenosa Cresson, 1930
N. occidentalis Sturtevant & Wheeler, 1954
N. picta (Fallén, 1913)
N. pulchra (Williston, 1896)
N. quinquenotata Cresson, 1930
N. scutellaris Cresson, 1933
N. slossonae Coquillett, 1900

References

Ephydridae
Taxa named by Daniel William Coquillett
Diptera of Australasia
Diptera of North America
Diptera of Europe
Brachycera genera